Alaska Seas is a 1954 American crime film noir directed by Jerry Hopper and starring Robert Ryan and Brian Keith. The supporting cast features Jan Sterling, Gene Barry and Aaron Spelling. The picture is a loose remake of the 1938 film Spawn of the North, which had starred George Raft, Henry Fonda and John Barrymore.

Plot
Matt Kelly is released from jail and skips town in his boat without paying outstanding storage fees. Back in his home town he is hired by his old friend Jim Kimmerly, the head of the local salmon fishermen who have formed a canning co-operative. The fishermen are battling against an organised gang who are robbing the fishing traps. Matt however, short on cash, joins the raiders, whilst Jim, unaware of his duplicity, keeps covering for him amongst the other fishermen. Furthermore, Kelly has his eyes upon Jim's fiancée, Nicki. Kelly's recklessness eventually causes the loss of Kimmerly's fishing boat in a glacier avalanche. He tries to make amends for his misdemeanours in an act of self-sacrifice.

Cast
Robert Ryan as Matt Kelly
Brian Keith as Jim Kimmerly
Jan Sterling as Nicki Jackson
Gene Barry as Verne Williams
Richard Shannon as Tom Erickson
Ralph Dumke as Dad Jackson
Ross Bagdasarian, Sr. as Joe
Timothy Carey as Wycroff
Peter Coe as Greco
Jim Hayward as The jailer
Aaron Spelling as The knifer
William Fawcett as The silversmith

Production
Van Heflin was meant to star alongside Ryan and Jan Sterling. He pulled out just before filming and he was replaced by Brian Keith, who was playing another part. Gene Barry stepped into Keith's old role.

References

External links
 

1954 films
1954 crime drama films
American black-and-white films
1950s English-language films
Remakes of American films
Films about fishing
Films directed by Jerry Hopper
Films set in Alaska
Films set in the 1920s
Paramount Pictures films
American crime drama films
1950s American films